Rollins Creek (also known as Rollins Branch) is a stream in the U.S. state of Missouri. It is a tributary of the Des Moines River.

Rollins Creek has the name of the local Rollins family.

See also
List of rivers of Missouri

References

Rivers of Clark County, Missouri
Rivers of Missouri